Maria Angela Danzì (born 5 July 1957) is an Italian politician who has been serving as a Member of the European Parliament for the Five Star Movement since 2022.

References

See also 

 List of members of the European Parliament for Italy, 2019–2024

1957 births
Living people

21st-century Italian politicians
21st-century Italian women politicians
MEPs for Italy 2019–2024
Five Star Movement MEPs
Five Star Movement politicians
21st-century women MEPs for Italy